The Beretta Cx4 Storm is a pistol-calibre semi-automatic carbine aimed at the sporting, personal defense and law enforcement markets. It is available in two models: one that accepts 92/96 magazines, and one that accepts Px4 series magazines, each available in 9×19mm Parabellum, .40 S&W, .45 ACP, and 9×21mm.

The Beretta Mx4 Storm is the military version of the Cx4 Storm, which is capable of fully automatic fire. It features a 12-inch barrel, and most commonly seen with a 30-round magazine.

Design details 
Both the Mx4 Storm and Cx4 Storm features a Picatinny rail on top of the receiver for mounting modern optics, and a tri-rail adapter for mounting flashlights, laser sights, grips and other accessories. The firearm also has some ambidextrous features, such as being able to switch the fire selector, charging handle, ejection port and magazine release to the left side.

The Cx4 Storm was developed to be used in conjunction with Beretta semi-automatic pistols. For example, the magazines for the Beretta 92FS chambered in 9mm can be used in the Cx4 (also chambered in 9mm).

Conversion between Px4 Storm, 92/96 and 8000/8040 Cougar 9×19mm Parabellum/.40 S&W magazines requires two parts (not included with rifle). For Px4 magazines the C5C620 magazine insert and C89210 magazine release button are required, for 92/96 the C5A511 insert and C89109 release, for Cougar the C5A670 insert and C89110 release.

International legal status 

In Canada, the Cx4 Storm was the primary weapon used in the 2006 Dawson College shooting. The restricted class firearm had been acquired legally, and a coroner's inquest into the shooting recommended that all semi-automatic rifles be banned in Canada. The Common Sense Firearms Licensing Act passed in 2015 did not include a provision for such a ban. Sales of the CX4 Storm increased in Canada following the shooting, and in 2011, Beretta introduced a non-restricted (19" barrel) variant of the Cx4, making it more accessible. On May 1, 2020, the Canadian government reclassified the Cx4 Storm (in all its variants) to be prohibited firearms.

Users

: In 2013, the Italian Navy (Comforsbarc) ordered 90 Beretta Mx4 Storms (for €58,606) to be delivered in 2014; a second order was placed in 2017.
: procured for use by Paramilitary forces of India.
: In 2009 ordered 1,900 carbines, before the civil war.
: Russian police received a large order of Cx4 carbines with a lengthened 500mm barrel.
: Used by Albany County, NY Sheriff's Department (.40 S&W), St. Louis Police Department, and College of William & Mary Campus Police Department.
: Ordered in 2012 by Comando Nacional de la Guardia del Pueblo (Venezuelan Bolivarian National Guard).

References

External links
Beretta
Beretta Cx4 Storm web site
Independent Review of the Beretta Cx4 Storm

Cx4 Storm
Semi-automatic rifles
.45 ACP firearms
9mm Parabellum firearms
Submachine guns of Italy
Police weapons
Carbines
Military equipment introduced in the 2000s